Berth Klarrenn Elouga  is a Portuguese beauty pageant titleholder who was crowned as Miss Queen Portugal 2015 and Portugal's representative in Miss Earth 2015.

Pageantry

Miss Intercontinental 2013
Berth firstly represented Portugal at Miss Intercontinental pageant in 2013 which held in Magdeburg, Germany. She was declared unplaced but was given the "Miss Photogenic" award.

Miss Queen Portugal 2015
After two years, Berth once again joined a beauty pageant through Miss Queen Portugal 2015. The pageant was held at Cascais, Portugal. At the end of the event, Berth was declared as Miss Queen Portugal 2015.

Miss Earth 2015
By winning the Miss Queen Portugal 2015, Berth is the Miss Earth Portugal as well and becomes Portugal's representative to be Miss Earth 2015 and would try to succeed Jamie Herrell as the next Miss Earth.

References

Miss Earth 2015 contestants
Living people
People from Lisbon
Portuguese beauty pageant winners
1995 births